Emma Kissling (1862 or 1864?  1950?) was a scientific illustrator who worked for the Prince of Monaco and completed illustrations of marine species. Her work was published in Poissons provenant des campagnes du yacht Princesse-Alice (1901-1910).

References 

Women illustrators
1860s births
1950s deaths